William Ludwig (May 16, 1912 – February 7, 1999) was an American screenwriter.

Ludwig graduated from Columbia University in 1932. He was a member of the Philolexian Society at Columbia. In 1937 he joined MGM and his first screenplay was Love Finds Andy Hardy. He won, with Sonya Levien, an Oscar for "Best Writing, Story and Screenplay" in 1955 for Interrupted Melody. He remained a contract writer at MGM for 20 years, an industry record.

Other notable works include the screenplay for the 1955 production of Oklahoma!.

He died of complications from Parkinson disease.

References

External links
 

1912 births
1999 deaths
Writers from New York City
American male screenwriters
Columbia College (New York) alumni
Best Original Screenplay Academy Award winners
Neurological disease deaths in California
Deaths from Parkinson's disease
Screenwriters from New York (state)
20th-century American male writers
20th-century American screenwriters